Kane Hekili (February 26,2002 -May 25,2016  was a Thoroughbred racehorse named after "The Thunder God" in Hawaiian mythology. In 2005 and 2006 he won four Grade 1 races on dirt in Japan and finished fourth to Electrocutionist in the 2006 Dubai World Cup.

Kane Hekili was injured after finishing second in the Teio Sho on June 28, 2006. He did not race again for more than twenty-eight months following surgery for a bowed tendon. He returned to racing on November 8, 2008 in the  Grade 3  Musashino Stakes, finishing four lengths back of the winner. Entered in the December 7th Japan Cup Dirt, a Grade 1 race he won in 2005, Kane Hekili stunned his rivals and racing fans with a winning performance under French jockey, Christophe Lemaire.

Stud career
Kane Hekili's descendants include:

c = colt, f = filly

Pedigree

References

External links
 Pedigree for Kane Hekili
  
2002 racehorse births
Thoroughbred family 2-s
Racehorses bred in Japan
Racehorses trained in Japan